Brooklyn DA is a six-part American news documentary series which aired on CBS. It follows the prosecutors of the Kings County District Attorney's office in Brooklyn, New York. The series premiered on May 28, 2013.

One of the largest district attorney's (DA) offices in the United States, the prosecutors routinely face cases of murder, mobsters, unscrupulous judges, political corruption, and young girls trafficked as sex slaves. The series was created by CBS News veteran Patti Aronofsky, and it is produced by the same team who produces 48 Hours.

References

External links

Brooklyn DA at CBS News
Kings County District Attorney's Office website

2010s American documentary television series
2013 American television series debuts
2013 American television series endings
Brooklyn
CBS original programming
CBS News
English-language television shows
Television series by CBS Studios
Television shows set in Brooklyn